Bath Iron Works (BIW) is a major United States shipyard located on the Kennebec River in Bath, Maine, founded in 1884 as Bath Iron Works, Limited. Since 1995, Bath Iron Works has been a subsidiary of General Dynamics, which was the fifth-largest defense contractor in the world as of 2008. BIW has built private, commercial, and military vessels, most of which have been ordered by the United States Navy.

History 
Bath Iron Works was incorporated in 1884 by General Thomas W. Hyde, a native of Bath who served in the American Civil War. After the war, he bought a shop that made windlasses and other iron hardware for the wooden ships built in Bath's many shipyards. He expanded the business by improving its practices, entering new markets, and acquiring other local businesses. By 1882, Hyde Windlass was eyeing the new and growing business of iron shipbuilding, and it incorporated as Bath Iron Works in 1884. On February 28, 1890, BIW won its first contract for complete vessels: two iron gunboats for the Navy. In 1892, the yard won its first commercial contract for the 2,500-ton steel passenger steamer . In the 1890s, the company built several yachts for wealthy sailors.

In 1899, Hyde was suffering from Bright's Disease and resigned from management of the shipyard, leaving his sons Edward and John in charge. The shipyard began construction of  that same year, the only battleship ever built in Bath. It dominated the yard for five years until its launching in 1904, and was at times the only ship under construction. The yard faced numerous challenges because of the weight of armor and weapons. In sea trials, Georgia averaged  for four hours, making her the fastest ship in her class and the fastest battleship in the United States Navy at the time. The company continued to rely on Navy contracts, which provided 86-percent of the value of new contracts between 1905 and 1917. The yard also produced fishing trawlers, freighters, and yachts throughout the first half of the century. These included Vanda, Hi-Esmaro, Aras I and Aras II, Caroline, and Corsair IV, which later served as a cruise ship before sinking off Acapulco, Mexico in 1949. The shipyard was at peak production during World War II (1943–1944) and launched a destroyer every 17 days. Bath Iron Works ranked 50th among United States corporations in the value of World War II military production contracts. In 1981, Falcon Transport ordered two tankers, the last commercial vessels built by BIW.

 was commissioned at Bath in 1986, and it survived a mine explosion which tore a hole in its engine room and flooded two compartments. Over the next two years, BIW repaired the ship in unique fashion. The guided missile frigate was towed to the company's dry dock in Portland, Maine, and put up on blocks, where the damaged engine room was cut out of the ship. Meanwhile, workers in Bath built a 315-ton replacement, and the module was floated south to Portland, placed on the dry dock, slid into place under the frigate, jacked up, and welded into place.

In 1995, Bath Iron Works was bought by General Dynamics. In 2001, the company wrapped up a four-year effort to build the Land Level Transfer Facility, an enormous concrete platform for final assembly of its ships, instead of building them on a sloping way so that they could slide into the Kennebec at launch. Hulls are now moved by rail from the platform horizontally onto a moveable dry dock, which greatly reduced the work involved in building and launching the ships. The , 28,000-ton dry dock was built by China's Jiangdu Yuchai Shipbuilding Company for $27 million.

In 2015, Bath Iron Works signed contracts with US Navy to build new Arleigh Burke-class destroyers, as well as to conduct maintenance sustainment support of Independence-class littoral combat ships built by competitor Austal USA. On March 27, Bath received a $610.4 million contract modification to build John Basilone. This ship was funded in the 2015 defense appropriations act.

In 2016, Dirk Lesko became president of Bath Iron Works. 

In 2020, 4,300 workers, all members of the International Association of Machinists and Aerospace Workers, voted to go on strike after the company and the union failed to agree to new labor contracts. The shipbuilders eventually agreed to a 3 year pact and returned to work after 63 days of strike. 

Lesko resigned unexpectedly on April 7, 2022, the same day the union local announced that it had come to an agreement with the shipyard. On May 5, 2022, Charles F. Krugh was appointed president. A General Dynamics employee since 2011, Krugh had lately been a vice president in the company's Gulfstream Aerospace subsidiary.

Notable ships built

Yachts
 Aphrodite completed for Oliver Hazard Payne 1899, the largest American built steam yacht at the time
 Ranger, successful America's Cup defender
 Aras II, Presidential Yacht known as USS Williamsburg
 Corsair IV, large yacht built for J. P. Morgan Jr.
 Lightvessels
 Diamond Shoal Lightship No. 71 (LV-71)
 Nantucket Lightship 66
 Nantucket Lightship 106
 Gunboat
 USS Machias, Spanish–American War and World War I
 Naval ram
 
 Monitor
 
  protected cruiser
  World War I
 
 , launched in 1904

 
 World War I
 s
  World War I
  World War I
 5 of 21 s
  World War I – Rum Patrol
  World War I
  World War I – Rum Patrol
  World War I – Rum Patrol
  World War I
 2 of 4 s
  World War I – Rum Patrol
  World War I – Rum Patrol
 1 of 6 
  World War I – Rum Patrol
 1 of 6 
  World War I
 2 of 6 s
  World War I – Rum Patrol
  World War I – Attack on Pearl Harbor
 1 of 6 
  World War I – Guadalcanal Campaign – Operation Flintlock – Battle of Saipan – Philippines campaign (1944–45)

 8 of 111 s
  World War I – Destroyers for Bases Agreement
  World War I – Destroyers for Bases Agreement
  World War I
  Destroyers for Bases Agreement
  Destroyers for Bases Agreement – St. Nazaire Raid
  Destroyers for Bases Agreement
  Destroyers for Bases Agreement
  Destroyers for Bases Agreement
 3 of 156 s

  Attack on Pearl Harbor – Guadalcanal Campaign
  Attack on Pearl Harbor – Battle of Empress Augusta Bay
  Attack on Pearl Harbor

 
 
 
 
 
  sank U-352
 
  sank U-157
 1 of 8 Farragut-class destroyers (1934)
  Attack on Pearl Harbor – Battle of the Coral Sea – Battle of Midway – Guadalcanal Campaign – Battle of the Eastern Solomons – Battle of the Philippine Sea
 The J-class yacht Ranger, 1936
 2 of 18 s
  Battle of Tassafaronga Philippines campaign (1944–45)
  Battle of Tassafaronga – Philippines campaign (1944–45) – sunk in test Able of Operation Crossroads
 3 of 6 s
 
 
  Invasion of Normandy
 2 of 12 s
  Battle of the Coral Sea
  Battle of Midway – Battle of the Santa Cruz Islands – Naval Battle of Guadalcanal – Philippines campaign (1944–45)
 8 of 66 s
  invasions of Sicily, Italy and Southern France
  invasions of Sicily, Italy and Southern France
  invasions of North Africa and Southern France
  invasions of North Africa and Southern France
  invasions of North Africa, Sicily and Italy
  invasions of North Africa, Sicily, Italy and Southern France
  invasions of North Africa, Normandy, Southern France and Okinawa
  invasions of North Africa, Southern France and Okinawa

 31 of 175 
  Guadalcanal campaign – Philippines campaign (1944–45) – Korean War – Vietnam War
  Naval Battle of Guadalcanal Guadalcanal campaign – Naval Battle of Vella Lavella – Philippines campaign (1944–45) – Korean War – Vietnam War
  Guadalcanal campaign – Naval Battle of Vella Lavella
  Guadalcanal campaign
  Guadalcanal campaign – Philippines campaign (1944–45) – Korean War – Vietnam War
  Guadalcanal campaign
  Guadalcanal campaign – Philippines campaign (1944–45) – Korean War
  Guadalcanal campaign – Philippines campaign (1944–45) – Battle of Surigao Strait – Korean War
  Guadalcanal campaign – Battle of Empress Augusta Bay Battle of Cape St. George – Battle of the Philippine Sea – Philippines campaign (1944–45)
  Guadalcanal campaign – Philippines campaign (1944–45)
  Guadalcanal campaign – Battle of Empress Augusta Bay – Philippines campaign (1944–45) – Battle of Okinawa
  Guadalcanal campaign – Battle of Empress Augusta Bay – Battle of Cape St. George – Battle of the Philippine Sea – Philippines campaign (1944–45)
   Guadalcanal campaign – Battle of the Philippine Sea – Battle of Iwo Jima
  Guadalcanal campaign – Battle of Empress Augusta Bay – Battle of the Philippine Sea – Philippines campaign (1944–45) – Battle of Okinawa
  Guadalcanal campaign – Battle of the Philippine Sea – Battle of Okinawa
  Guadalcanal campaign – Battle of the Philippine Sea – Philippines campaign (1944–45) – Battle of Okinawa
  Philippines campaign (1944–45) – Battle of Okinawa – Korean War – Vietnam War
  Philippines campaign (1944–45)
  Battle of the Philippine Sea – Philippines campaign (1944–45) – Battle of Okinawa
  Philippines campaign (1944–45) – Battle of Okinawa – Korean War
  Philippines campaign (1944–45) – Battle of Okinawa
  Guadalcanal campaign – Philippines campaign (1944–45) – Battle of Surigao Strait
  Philippines campaign (1944–45) – Battle of Okinawa – Korean War
  Battle of the Philippine Sea – Philippines campaign (1944–45)
  Battle of the Philippine Sea – Philippines campaign (1944–45) – Vietnam War
  Mariana and Palau Islands Campaign – Philippines campaign (1944–45) – Battle of Okinawa – Vietnam War
  Battle of the Philippine Sea – Philippines campaign (1944–45)
  Battle of Saipan – Philippines campaign (1944–45) – Battle of Surigao Strait – Battle of Okinawa
  Battle of Saipan
  Battle of Saipan
  Philippines campaign (1944–45)

 14 of 58 s
  Invasion of Normandy – Philippines campaign (1944–45) – Korean War
  Invasion of Normandy – Philippines campaign (1944–45) – Battle of Okinawa – Korean War – Vietnam War
  Invasion of Normandy – Philippines campaign (1944–45) – Battle of Okinawa – Korean War – preserved National Historic Landmark in Charleston, South Carolina
  Invasion of Normandy – Philippines campaign (1944–45) – Korean War – Vietnam War
  Invasion of Normandy
  Philippines campaign (1944–45) – Battle of Okinawa – Korean War
  Philippines campaign (1944–45) – Korean War – Vietnam War
  Philippines campaign (1944–45) – Battle of Okinawa – Korean War – Vietnam War
  Philippines campaign (1944–45) – Korean War
  Battle of Okinawa – Korean War – Gulf of Tonkin Incident – Vietnam War
  Battle of Okinawa – Korean War
  Battle of Okinawa
  Battle of Okinawa – Korean War
  Battle of Okinawa

 6 of 12 s
  Battle of Okinawa
  Battle of Okinawa
  Battle of Okinawa
  Battle of Okinawa
  Battle of Okinawa
  Battle of Okinawa
 30 of 98 s
  World War II – Korean War – Vietnam War
  World War II – Korean War – Vietnam War
  Korean War
  World War II – Korean War – Vietnam War – Battle of Dong Hoi
  World War II – Vietnam War
  Vietnam War
  Korean War – Vietnam War
 
  (Experimental ship completed with aluminum superstructure and high-horsepower engines)
  Vietnam War
  Vietnam War
 
  Korean War – Vietnam War
  Korean War – Vietnam War
 
  Vietnam War
  Korean War – Vietnam War
  Vietnam War
  Korean War
  Vietnam War
 
  Recovered astronaut John Glenn in Friendship 7 on 20 February 1962
  Korean War – Vietnam War
 
  Vietnam War
  Korean War – Vietnam War
  Korean War – Vietnam War
  Vietnam War
  (no overseas deployments – used exclusively for ASW research)
  Vietnam War
 s
 
 
 

 s
 
  Vietnam War
 s
 
 
  Vietnam War
  Vietnam War
 
  Vietnam War
  Vietnam War
  Vietnam War
  Vietnam War
 s
 
 
 
 
 D185 
 D186 
 D187 
 Farragut-class destroyers (1958)
 
  Vietnam War
 s
 
 
  Vietnam War
 s
 
 
  Vietnam War
  Vietnam War
  Vietnam War
 
 
 s
 
 
 
 s
 
 
 
 
 
 
 
 
 
 
 
 
 
 
 
 
 
 
 
 
 
 , launched August 31, 1984.
 , launched in 1984 and repaired after being punctured by a mine in 1988
 
 s
 
 
 
 
 
 
 
 , 21 Feb 2008 shot down the errant USA 193 satellite with a modified SM3 missile.
 s
 , commissioned July 4, 1991.
 
 
 
 
 
 
 
 
 
 
 
 
 
 
 
 
 
 
 
 
 
 
 
 , launched in 2005
 
 , launched in 2006

 
 
 
 
 
 
 
 
 USS Daniel Inouye (DDG-118)
 USS Carl M. Levin (DDG-120)
 USS John Basilone (DDG-122)
 USS Harvey C. Barnum Jr. (DDG-124)
 USS Louis H. Wilson Jr. (DDG-126)
 USS Patrick Gallagher (DDG-127)
 USS William Charette (DDG-130)
 s

References

Further reading
 (First general history of BIW.)
 (Describes the construction of a Perry-class guided missile frigate, the training of its precommissioning crew at BIW, and the complex repair job that returned it to duty.)
 (The definitive work on BIW from 1884 to 1987.)
 (Historic and contemporary photos of BIW.)

External links 

Bath Iron Works website
USS Samuel B. Roberts (FFG-58) under repair at BIW's Portland dry dock

1995 mergers and acquisitions
America's Cup yacht builders
American companies established in 1884
Bath, Maine
Companies based in Sagadahoc County, Maine
Defense companies of the United States
General Dynamics
Kennebec River
Industrial buildings and structures in Maine
Manufacturing companies based in Maine
Manufacturing companies established in 1884
Manufacturing plants in the United States
Shipbuilding companies of the United States
Shipyards of the United States
1884 establishments in Maine
Shipyards building World War II warships